Sanjay Patel is an American animator and illustrator who has worked in the animation department of various projects, most of them animated films released by Pixar.

Background 
Born in London, United Kingdom to Gujarati Indian parents, Patel moved to the United States with his family at the age of four. His father bought a motel in San Bernardino, California and Patel grew up there.

Career 
He is best known for directing the short animated film Sanjay's Super Team (2015) inspired by Patel's own childhood, which received a nomination in the category of Best Animated Short Film at the 88th Academy Awards and for Best Animated Short Subject at the 43rd Annie Awards.

Since 1996, Patel has worked as an animator on numerous Pixar films such as Monsters, Inc. (2001), Ratatouille (2007), Cars (2006), Monsters University (2013), Toy Story 2 (1999) and The Incredibles (2004) and served as a character developer on the latter two films.

He also authored Ramayana: Divine Loophole, lending a whimsical illustration style and lighthearted voice to the Hindu epic , Ramayana.

Patel also started Ghee Happy. Ghee Happy is a brand that celebrates Indian mythology and culture through design and storytelling. Ghee Happy produces books, exhibits, and apparel. It is also an original Netflix animated series. The animated show reimagines Hindu deities as little kids discovering their powers in a deity daycare called Ghee Happy. As of 2021, the series has not yet premiered and status is unknown.

Filmography 

  The Simpsons (TV Series) (character layout artist - 2 episodes)
Grade School Confidential (1997) ... (character layout artist)
A Milhouse Divided (1996) ... (character layout artist)
A Bug's Life (1998) Additional Character Designer / Animator
Toy Story 2 (1999) Story Artist / Animator
Monsters, Inc. (2001) Story Artist / Animator
The Incredibles (2004) Story Artist / Animator
Ratatouille (2007) Animator
Your Friend the Rat (2007) Additional Character Designer
Toy Story 3 (2010) Fix & Additional Animation
Cars 2 (2011) Fix & Additional Animation
Monsters University (2013) Character Development & Animation
Sanjay's Super Team (2015) Writer & Director
Incredibles 2 (2018) Story Artist

References

External links
 

Living people
American animators
American animated film directors
Pixar people
Year of birth missing (living people)
Gujarati people
British people of Indian descent
British people of Gujarati descent
American people of Indian descent
American people of Gujarati descent